The 1948–49 Cypriot First Division was the 12th season of the Cypriot top-level football league.

Overview
It was contested by 8 teams, and APOEL F.C. won the championship.

League standings

Results

References
Cyprus - List of final tables (RSSSF)

Cypriot First Division seasons
Cyp
1